Dastak, Iran is a village in Gilan Province, Iran.

Dastak in Iran may also refer to:
 Dastak-e Olya, Kermanshah Province
 Dastak-e Sofla, Kermanshah Province